Cardiff Festivals are a series of festivals held in the capital of Wales, Cardiff and nearby areas every summer. The festival started back in the 1980s and are organised by several associations.

The festivals include:
 Velothon Wales
 Extreme Sailing Series
 Cardiff Triathlon
 Tafwyl
 Cardiff International Food and Drink Festival
 Welsh Proms
 Cardiff Carnival
 Pride Cymru

References